This article lists all marquessates, extant, extinct, dormant, abeyant, or forfeit, in the peerages of England, Scotland, Great Britain, Ireland, and the United Kingdom.

The title of Marquess of Dublin, which is perhaps best described as Anglo-Irish, was the first to be created, in 1385, but like the next few creations, the title was soon forfeit.  The title of Marquess of Pembroke, created in 1532 by Henry VIII for Anne Boleyn, has the distinction of being the first English hereditary peerage granted to a woman in her own right (styled "Marchioness" in the patent). The English title Marquess of Winchester, created in 1551, is the earliest still extant, so is Premier Marquess of England.  The title long remained less common, and on the evening of the Coronation of Queen Victoria in 1838, the Prime Minister Lord Melbourne explained to her (from her journals): 
"I spoke to Ld M. about the numbers of Peers present at the Coronation, & he said it was quite unprecedented. I observed that there were very few Viscounts, to which he replied "There are very few Viscounts," that they were an old sort of title & not really English; that they came from Vice-Comites; that Dukes & Barons were the only real English titles; — that Marquises were likewise not English, & that people were mere made Marquises, when it was not wished that they should be made Dukes".

Marquessates in the Peerage of England, 1385–1707

Marquessates in the Peerage of Scotland, 1488–1707

Marquessates in the Peerage of Great Britain, 1707–1801

Marquessates in the Peerage of Ireland, 1642–1825

Marquessates in the Peerage of the United Kingdom, 1801 to present

See also
British nobility
Marquesses in the United Kingdom
List of marquesses in the peerages of Britain and Ireland

References

 Marquessates
Britain and Ireland
Marquessates